American singer and songwriter Joi Cardwell has released eight studio albums, five compilation albums, two EPs, and 57 singles (including 10 as a featured artist).

Joi Cardwell released her debut album The World Is Full of Trouble in the United States in May 1995. The album's lead single, "Trouble", reached number eleven on the Billboard Dance Club Songs. Her self-titled second album was released in November 1997, and was their breakthrough release. The first-two singles, "Soul to Bare" and "Run to You", peaked in the top-two positions with the latter peaking atop the US Billboard Dance chart. The follow-up album, Deliverance, featured a more urban sound that was released on her own recording label No-Mad Industries in 1999.

The fourth album, The Plain Jane Project, was released in the fall of 2005. The album spawned the top-ten singles "Freedom" and "It's Over". She released her fifth album Wanderlust (The Soundtrack) in 2009, followed by Must Be the Music in 2011. In September 2014, Cardwell released her seventh album The Art of Being on her new recording label Curly Gurly Records.

Albums

Studio albums

Compilation albums

Extended plays

Singles

As lead artist

As featured artist

Album appearances

References

Discographies of American artists
Electronic music discographies
Pop music discographies
Rhythm and blues discographies